The Mayor of Mandaue City is the head of the Local government of the city. Since the Pre-Hispanic time were chiefs, only two are known Aponoan and Lambuzzan. Not many people are mentioned in the Spanish Expedition chronicles; the former was succeeded by the latter. During the year 1600 when the Spanish subjugated Mandaue Andug was the chief of the settlement. Before there were priests, Capitanes, Tenientes and the Cabeza de Barangay were the local leaders in Spanish regime. Later, in the American commonwealth era of the Philippines the leaders were the President and after the war the title changed to Mayor. Mandaue was only incorporated as a city on June 21, 1969 in the term of Mayor Demetrio Cortes Sr. which  led to the signing of the City Charter on August 30, 1969 under Republic Act No 5519.

Mandaue's Administration in the Prehispanic time were Chiefs only two are known Aponoan and Lambusan who existed in the Spanish Expedition. Before Priests, Capitanes, Tenientes and the Cabeza de Barangay were the local leaders in Spanish regime then in the American commonwealth era of the Philippines the leaders were the El Presidentes of Mandaue and after the war the changed the title to Mayor in 1943.

Presidente

Alejandro Fortuna was the final leader under the title El Presidente of Mandaue. He was succeeded by Ariston Cortes under the title of Mayor of the Town of Mandaue. He was beheaded due to treason, dated March 26, 1945 at the age of 41 years.

Mayor

Note
 Officer-in-charge.

References

Politics of Mandaue